Asenele Velebayi (born 11 December 2002) is a South African soccer player currently playing as a midfielder for Ajax Cape Town.

Career statistics

Club

Notes

References

2002 births
Living people
South African soccer players
Association football midfielders
National First Division players
Cape Town Spurs F.C. players